Abhayam Thedi is a 1986 Indian Malayalam film, directed by I. V. Sasi. The film stars Mohanlal, Shobhana, Sukumari and Thilakan in the lead roles. The film has musical score by Shyam.

Plot
The film tells the story of a girl who returns to her late father’s ancestral home after falling out with her mother. The story details how her family treats her, her interactions with her cousins, and her determination to help them with their problems while battling her own problems.

Cast

Mohanlal as Appu / Appettan
Shobhana as Miranda / Meera
Thilakan as Meera's grandfather P. K. Nair
Sukumari as Ammalukutty
Ramachandran as Madhavankutty 
KPAC Lalitha as Bhargavi
Janardanan as C. S. Nair
Ashokan as Anil
Rohini as Vasanthi
Raveendran as Rajendran 
Baby Anju as Asha
Kuthiravattam Pappu as Kumaran
Y. Vijaya as Tessy
Santhakumari as Paarukutty

Soundtrack
The music was composed by Shyam and the lyrics were written by S. Ramesan Nair.

References

External links
 

1986 films
1980s Malayalam-language films
1986 drama films
Indian drama films
Films with screenplays by M. T. Vasudevan Nair
Films directed by I. V. Sasi